Massachusetts Senate's 1st Suffolk and Middlesex district in the United States is one of 40 legislative districts of the Massachusetts Senate. It covers 1.5% of Middlesex County and 20.6% of Suffolk County population in 2010. Democrat Lydia Edwards has represented the district since 2022.

Locales represented
The district includes the following localities:
 parts of Boston
 parts of Cambridge
 Revere
 Winthrop

As of 2016, the district had been "long known as the Eastie seat."

Senators 
 Anthony Petruccelli
 Robert Travaglini
 Joseph Boncore (2016–2021)
 Lydia Edwards (2022–present)

See also
 List of Massachusetts Senate elections
 List of Massachusetts General Courts
 List of former districts of the Massachusetts Senate
 Middlesex County districts of the Massachusetts House of Representatives: 1st, 2nd, 3rd, 4th, 5th, 6th, 7th, 8th, 9th, 10th, 11th, 12th, 13th, 14th, 15th, 16th, 17th, 18th, 19th, 20th, 21st, 22nd, 23rd, 24th, 25th, 26th, 27th, 28th, 29th, 30th, 31st, 32nd, 33rd, 34th, 35th, 36th, 37th
 Suffolk County districts of the Massachusetts House of Representatives: 1st, 2nd, 3rd, 4th, 5th, 6th, 7th, 8th, 9th, 10th, 11th, 12th, 13th, 14th, 15th, 16th, 17th, 18th, 19th

References

External links
 Ballotpedia
  (State Senate district information based on U.S. Census Bureau's American Community Survey).
 League of Women Voters of Boston

Senate 
Government of Middlesex County, Massachusetts
Government of Suffolk County, Massachusetts
Massachusetts Senate